Peter Gustafsson (born 17 August 1976) is a Swedish professional golfer, born in Orust, Sweden. He turned professional in 1999.

After just missing out on automatic graduation from the Challenge Tour in 2004, Gustafsson was medalist at the European Tour Qualifying School to gain his place on the European Tour for 2005. In his début season he was runner up in two tournaments, the Jazztel Open de España en Andalucía and the Omega European Masters, and finished in 46th place on the Order of Merit. Despite that, he missed out on the Sir Henry Cotton Rookie of the Year award, which went to Gonzalo Fernández-Castaño of Spain. In subsequent seasons, he was unable to consistently produce those same high levels of performance, and lost his place on the European Tour in 2007.

In 2009, Gustafsson won the Abierto Internacional de Golf Copa Antioquia, the opening event of the Tour de las Américas season, in Colombia, coming from behind in the final round to claim victory by one stroke. He rounded off the season with top five finishes in both the Argentine Masters and the Argentine Open as he ended the year as winner of the Tour de las Américas Order of Merit for 2009.

Professional wins (9)

Tour de las Américas wins (1)

Nordic Golf League wins (3)

Other wins (5)
1997 Telia Tour Höstkval 2 (Telia Tour)
2002 Lear Open Silfverschiöldspokalen (Swedish Tour)
2005 Orust Open (Swedish Tour)
2006 Orust Open (Swedish Tour)
2017 Aegean Airlines Pro-Am (PGAs of Europe)

Playoff record
European Tour playoff record (0–1)

See also
2011 European Tour Qualifying School graduates

References

External links

Peter Gustafsson at golfdata.se

Swedish male golfers
European Tour golfers
Swedish expatriates in Monaco
Sportspeople from Västra Götaland County
People from Orust Municipality
People from Monte Carlo
1976 births
Living people